The University School of Physical Education in Krakow (AWF) is an institution of higher education in Kraków, Poland.

References

See also
 List of universities in Poland

Universities and colleges in Kraków
Educational institutions established in 1951
1951 establishments in Poland